{|
{{Infobox ship class overview
| Name = TT-400TP class gunboat| Builders = Z173 Shipyard
| Operators = 
| Cost = US$1,000,000 Unarmed
| In commission range = 2011
}}

|}

The TT-400TP is the first class of warship designed and built by Vietnam in Z173 Shipyard. This class is based on the "Lan" project designed by the Ukrainian State Research and Design Shipbuilding Center.

The name "TT-400TP" is abbreviated by Vietnamese words: TT is Tuần Tra (Patrol), 400 is over 400 tons, TP is Tàu Pháo (gunboat).

The ships were constructed under the purview of Colonel Nguyen Van Cuong.

History
The first TT-400TP was constructed in 2009, following by sea trials in 2011. The second TT-400TP ship, known as HQ-274, was handed over on May 28, 2014.

The 3rd and 4th TT-400TP ships, known as HQ-272 and HQ-273, were commissioned on October 25, 2014. As of May 2017, 6 TT-400TPs are known to be in service.

In 2015, Asia Times reported rumors that the Philippines was potentially willing to purchase TT-400TP ships.

DesignTT-400TP'' class ships have gun control automatic weapons on the sea with four tasks: destroying hostile amphibious ships and corvettes of the enemy and protecting the base of the amphibious fleet and fleet escort in the operation of ships in service forces and forces scan mines, protection of civilian ships at sea and tactical reconnaissance planes of the water.

Z173 shipyard engineers were involved in the construction after being trained abroad.

Its speed is 32 nautical miles per hour and it can operate on sea for 30 days. It has a length of 54.16m, a width of 9.16m and a full load displacement of 480 tons.

The ship is equipped with AK-630 anti-aircraft guns, AK-176 cannons, 2x 14.5 machine guns and Igla MANPADs.

The TT-400TP is manufactured for $1 million USD.

Ships

References

External Links
  

Ships of the Vietnam People's Navy